Hedd may refer to:

Hedd Wyn, a Welsh-language poet
Hedd Records, a subsidiary label of Virgin Records
Harold Hedd, a comic strip by Rand Holmes
HEDD, a bogus explosives-detection device